Lamech (Lemeḵ, in pausa  Lāmeḵ;  Lámekh) was a patriarch in the genealogies of Adam in the Book of Genesis. He is part of the genealogy of Jesus in Luke 3:36.

Lamech (Arabic: لامك, romanized: Lāmik) is also mentioned in Islam in the various collections of tales of the prophets who preceded Muhammad, which mentions him in an identical manner.

Bible narrative

Biblical genealogy 
Lamech is the eighth-generation descendant of Adam, the son of Methuselah, and the father of Noah, in the genealogy of Seth in Genesis 5. In Genesis 5:12-25, Lamech was a son of Methuselah, who was a grandson of Jared, who was a grandson of Kenan descended from Adam.

Genesis 5:28–31 records that Lamech was 182 (according to the Masoretic Text; 188 according to the Septuagint) years old at the birth of Noah and lived for another 595 years, attaining an age at death of 777 years, five years before the Flood in the Masoretic chronology. With such numbers in this genealogical account, Adam would still have been alive for about the first 56 years of Lamech's life.

Prophetic naming
When Lamech named his son Noah, he prophesied: "This [same] shall comfort us concerning our work and toil of our hands, because of the ground which the  hath cursed." Albert Barnes noted: "In stating the reason of the name, they employ a word which is connected with it only by a second remove. נוּח nûach and נחם nācham are stems not immediately connected; but they both point back to a common root נח (n-ch) signifying 'to sigh, to breathe, to rest, to lie down. At Noah's sacrifice in the new world after the flood, the  said, "I will not again curse the ground any more for man’s sake; for the imagination of man’s heart [is] evil from his youth; neither will I again smite any more every thing living, as I have done."

Tomb 
According to a local Afghan legend, Lamech was buried   from Mihtarlam. Ghaznavid Sultan Mahmud of Ghazni built a tomb and gardens over the presumed burial site. Mihtarlam itself is said to be named after Lamech.

In popular culture 
Lamech is portrayed by Marton Csokas in the film Noah (2014).

References

Book of Genesis people
Bereshit (parashah)
Noah